The 1913 Giro d'Italia was the fifth edition of the Giro d'Italia, a Grand Tour organized and sponsored by the newspaper La Gazzetta dello Sport. The race was won by the Italian rider Carlo Oriani of the Maino team. Second and third respectively were the Italian riders Eberardo Pavesi and Giuseppe Azzini.

It was the last Giro with a final classification in points and the first one in which the final winner of the race did not win a single stage. The Giro saw the debut of the twenty-year-old Costante Girardengo, who won the 6th stage. The 1913 Giro was the last concluded by Luigi Ganna, winner of the first edition.

Changes from the 1912 Giro d'Italia

Outside the yearly changes in the route, race length, and number of stages, the biggest change to how the general classification was to be calculated. The race organizers decided to change back to the way the general classification had been calculated in the earlier editions, by the individual and the awarding of points based on how high the rider placed in each stage rather than doing a team points based system like the previous edition.

Participants

Of the 99 riders that began the Giro d'Italia on 6 May, 35 of them made it to the finish in Milan on 22 May. Riders were allowed to ride on their own or as a member of a team. There were eight teams that competed in the race: Ganna-Dunlop, Gerbi-Dunlop, Globo-Dunlop, Legnano-Dunlop, Maino-Pirelli, Otav-Pirelli, Peugeot Italy-Tedeschi, and Stucchi-Dunlop.

The peloton was composed completely of Italians. The field featured three former Giro d'Italia champions in the 1909 winner Luigi Ganna, three-time winner and returning champion Carlo Galetti, and returning champion Eberardo Pavesi. Other notable Italian riders that started the race included Giovanni Rossignoli, Alfredo Sivocci, Carlo Oriani, and Giuseppe Azzini.

Final standings

Stage results

General classification

There were 35 cyclists who had completed all nine stages. For these cyclists, the points they received from each of their stage placing's were added up for the general classification. The cyclist with the least accumulated points was the winner.

Isolati rider classification

There was a classification for only the isolati riders that was called the "Premio Momo," it was calculated in the same manner as the general classification.

Team classification

To be eligible for the team classification, known in Italian as the Premio dell'Industria, the team must have three riders complete the course.> For each team that had at least the necessary three riders complete the race, the three riders with the lowest point totals from the team would be added together to give each team its score. The team with the lowest total of points was the winner of the classification.

Aftermath

Upon winning the race, Carlo Oriani enlisted in the Corps of the Bersaglieri, the Italian infantry, and got commissioned into World War I. Oriani died in a military hospital in Casserta.

References

Footnotes

Citations

Bibliography

 
Giro d'Italia by year
Giro Ditalia, 1913
Giro Ditalia, 1913
Giro d'Italia